The 2011 season is the inaugural year of Women's League Soccer. 

For the season, most of the WLS clubs are located in the Midwestern United States.

Elite Division

Standings

Top goalscorers

Top GKs

Division 2

Standings

Top goalscorers

Top GKs

References

3